The All-Ireland Senior Hurling Championship of 1971 was the 85th staging of Ireland's premier hurling knock-out competition.  Tipperary won the championship, beating Kilkenny 5-17 to 5-14 in the final at Croke Park, Dublin.

The championship

Participating counties

Format

The All-Ireland Senior Hurling Championship of 1971 was run on a provincial basis as usual.  It was a knockout tournament with pairings drawn at random in the respective provinces - there were no seeds.

Each match was played as a single leg. If a match was drawn there was a replay.  If both sides were still level at the end of that game another replay had to take place.

Munster Championship

Quarter-final: (1 match) This was a single match between the first two teams drawn from the province of Munster.

Semi-finals: (2 matches) The winner of the lone quarter-final joined the other three Munster teams to make up the semi-final pairings.

Final: (1 match) The winner of the two semi-finals contested this game.

Leinster Championship

First Round: (1 match) This was a single match between two of the 'weaker' teams drawn from the province of Leinster.

Quarter-finals: (2 matches) The winner of the first-round game joined three other Leinster teams to make up the two quarter-final pairings.

Semi-finals: (2 matches) The winners of the two quarter-finals joined Kilkenny and Wexford, who received a bye to this stage, to make up the semi-final pairings.

Final: (1 match) The winner of the two semi-finals contested this game.

All-Ireland Championship

Quarter-final: (1 match) This was a single match between Antrim and Galway, two teams who faced no competition in their respective provinces.

Semi-finals: (2 matches) The winner of the lone quarter-final joined London and the Munster and Leinster champions to make up the semi-final pairings.  The provincial champions were drawn in opposite semi-finals.

Final: (1 match) The winner of the two semi-finals contested this game.

Fixtures

Leinster Senior Hurling Championship

Munster Senior Hurling Championship

All-Ireland Senior Hurling Championship

Championship statistics

Scoring

Widest winning margin: 34 points
Galway 7-24 : 1-8 Antrim (All-Ireland quarter-final)
Most goals in a match: 10
Tipperary 5-17 : 5-14 Kilkenny (All-Ireland final)
Most points in a match: 34
Tipperary 3-26 : 6-8 Galway (All-Ireland semi-final)
Most goals by one team in a match: 7
Galway 7-24 : 1-8 Antrim (All-Ireland quarter-final)
Most goals scored by a losing team: 6
Galway 6-8 : 3-26 Tipperary (All-Ireland semi-final)
Most points scored by a losing team: 18 
Limerick 3-18 : 4-16 Tipperary (Munster final)

Miscellaneous

 The All-Ireland final between Tipperary and Kilkenny was the first championship decider to be broadcast in colour by Telefís Éireann. Some years later, it was revealed that RTÉ had recorded over its only copy of archive footage of the game, due to a shortage of blank cassette tape.
 Kilkenny's Eddie Keher set a new scoring record in an All-Ireland final.  He scored 2-11 of his team's total of 5-14 yet, remarkably, ended up on the losing team.

Top scorers

Season

Single game

Player facts

Debutantes

The following players made their début in the 1971 championship:

Retirees
The following players played their last game in the 1971 championship:

External links
All-Ireland Senior Hurling Championship 1971 Results

See also

References

1971
All-Ireland Senior Hurling Championship